The Fayette Stakes is a Grade II American thoroughbred horse race for horses age three and older over a distance of one and one-eighth miles on the dirt held annually in October at Keeneland Race Course in Lexington, Kentucky during the fall meeting. It currently offers a purse of $350,000.

History

The event is named for Fayette County, Kentucky, of which the city of Lexington is the county seat.

The inaugural running of the event was on 24 October 1959, closing day of the Keeneland Fall meeting as the Fayette Handicap. The event attracted some fine handicap horses from Kentucky and around the Midwest. The day the event was held the weather was wet and windy and the track was rated as sloppy. The winner H. Edsall Olson & R. Douglas Prewitt's Terra Firma, was a short 4/5 odds-on favorite after earlier in the month setting a new course record for the  miles distance in the Charles W. Bidwill Memorial Handicap at Hawthorne Race Course in Chicago. 

The following year the event was held on opening day of the Keeneland Fall meeting.

In the 1960s the event was won twice by horses that were imported to the United States by Bruno Ferrari. The 1961 longshot winner Zumbador II was the 1960 Uruguayan Triple Crown winner. The 1966 winner Yumbel was the 1965 Horse of the Year and Champion Older Horse in Chile. 

In 1963 the distance of the event was decreased to  miles and the winner Choker equaled the track record of 1:41 winning by two lengths. In 1965 the gallant six-year-old mare Old Hat won by a neck and was later voted as US Champion Older Dirt Female Horse for a second time.

Other fine winners of the event from that era include Thomas F. Devereux's Royal Harmony, who won the event three times straight, 1969-1971. His 1970 victory was noteworthy in that Royal Harmony defeated the 1970 Kentucky Derby winner Dust Commander who was promoted to second after Fast Hilarious was disqualified. The 1972 winner was the only other filly to win the event, Emanuel V. Benjamin III & William G. Clark's Chou Croute. Although Chou Croute was the favorite and won by a neck her outstanding performances during the year landed her US Champion Sprinter honors for 1972.

The event was run in two split divisions in 1976 and 1982.

In 1979 the distance of the event was reverted back to the original  miles. The same year the American Graded Stakes Committee upgraded the event to Grade III classification.

The race was contested on turf in 1985 for the only running and was won by 70/1 longshot Wop Wop setting a new course record for the turf distance in 1:51 winning by  lengths.

In 1987 the event was upgraded to Grade II status and although currently the event hold that status, between 1997 and 2008 the event held a Grade III classification.

In 1992 the conditions of the event were modified to stakes with allowances and the name was subsequently changed to Fayette Stakes.

In 1997 running Universe ridden by Craig Perret broke down early on while tracking leader Whiskey Wisdom causing Preocity to fall hindering the other three runners. Whiskey Wisdom went on to win easily by twelve lengths which remains to date to be the stakes winning margin record.

The distance of the event was increased to  miles in 1998. However, even with Breeders' Cup sponsorship awards the then event was poorly fielded and the distance was reverted back to  miles after three runnings of the event.

The event was run on Polytrack from 2006 through 2013.

Other notable winners of this event include 1990 Preakness Stakes winner Summer Squall who won the event in 1991 as the 2/5 odds-on favorite defeating his rival Unbridled by three lengths. One month later Unbridled would meet Summer Squall in the Breeders' Cup Classic at Churchill Downs with Unbridled finishing third and Summer Squall ninth.

The 2009 winner of this event, Blame won his first Graded stakes race in a career that would end with him winning the Breeders' Cup Classic the following year and winning US Champion Older Male Horse honors. Blame's sire and 2012 winner Newsdad's sire Arch won this event setting a new track record for the  miles distance in 1998.

The 2011 winner of this event, Wise Dan displayed his versatility winning on the polytrack surface and later becoming the US Horse of the Year in 2012 and 2013.

Records
Speed record:  
 miles: 1:46.80 - Good Command (1987) & Grand Jewel (1993)  
 miles: 1:41.20 - Silver Series (1978)
 miles: 1:53.87 - Arch (1998)

Margins
12 lengths – Whiskey Wisdom  (1997)

Most wins
 3 - Royal Harmony (1969, 1970, 1971)

Most wins by a jockey
 5 - Don Brumfield (1978, 1982, 1983, 1987, 1988)

Most wins by a trainer
 4 - Neil J. Howard (1991, 1993, 2004, 2005)

Most wins by an owner
 4 - William S. Farish III (1973, 1993, 2004, 2005)

Winners

Legend:

 
 
 

Notes:

§ Ran as an entry

ƒ Filly or Mare

† In the 1978 running of the event 1978 finished first but was disqualified for impeding Silver Series in the stretch run and set back to second.

See also
List of American and Canadian Graded races

External sites
Keeneland Media Guide

References

Graded stakes races in the United States
Grade 2 stakes races in the United States
Open mile category horse races
Recurring sporting events established in 1959
Keeneland horse races
1959 establishments in Kentucky